Philip Edward Long (born December 6, 1948) is an American former competition swimmer.

Long represented the United States at the 1968 Summer Olympics in Mexico City.  He competed in the final of the men's 200-meter breaststroke, and finished in seventh place with a time of 2:33.6.

Long attended Yale University, and swam for coach Phil Moriarty's Yale Bulldogs swimming and diving team in National Collegiate Athletic Association (NCAA) competition from 1968 to 1970.  He won the NCAA national championship in the 200-yard breaststroke in 1968.  He graduated from Yale with a bachelor's degree in psychology in 1970, and worked in Yale's information technology services starting in 1971, and as its director from 2001 to 2010.

See also
 List of Yale University people

References

External links
  Philip Long – Olympic athlete profile at Sports-Reference.com

1948 births
Living people
American male breaststroke swimmers
Olympic swimmers of the United States
Swimmers from Washington, D.C.
Swimmers at the 1968 Summer Olympics
Yale Bulldogs men's swimmers